Vikerraadio is an Estonian national radio channel of Eesti Rahvusringhääling (formerly Eesti Raadio). It began broadcasting on April 3, 1967. Ingrid Peek has been the editor-in-chief since August 7, 2017.

According to the Kantar Emor radio survey, as of 2022, Vikerraadio was the most listened-to radio station in Estonia by day, week and month. 122,000 listeners listened to Vikerradio per day and 230,000 listeners per week.

Frequencies
Kärdla 91,2 MHz
Kuressaare 105,6 MHz
Orissaare 105,9 MHz
Sõrve Peninsula 92,1 MHz
Ruhnu 96,4 MHz
Haapsalu 105,3 MHz
Dirhami 91,7 MHz
Tallinn 104,1 MHz
Rakvere 106,0 MHz
Ida-Viru County 105,4 MHz
Narva 104,7 MHz
Sillamäe 92,3 MHz
Rapla 95,7 MHz
Pärnu 104,8 MHz
Viljandi 107,0 MHz
Tartu 106,7 MHz
Tartu County, Põlva County, Valga County and Võru County 71,66 and 106,1 MHz
Järva County, Jõgeva County and Lääne-Viru County 105,1 MHz

References

External links
  

Eesti Rahvusringhääling
Radio stations in Estonia
Radio stations established in 1967
1957 establishments in Estonia
Mass media in Tallinn